Nicholas Gordon Martin (born 14 February 1950) is an Australian behavior geneticist who has published over 1300 peer-reviewed articles on topics including the heritability of religion and intelligence and medical disorders such as endometriosis. Martin is among the most cited medical scientists in the Southern Hemisphere, with a number of citation classics including "Genes, culture and personality: An empirical approach" that he co-authored with Lindon Eaves and Hans Eysenck, "Analysis of the p16 gene (CDKN2) as a candidate for the chromosome 9p melanoma susceptibility locus" (Nature, and "Genetic and environmental contributions to alcohol dependence risk in a national twin sample".

Early life
Martin studied at the University of Adelaide. In 1972 he established a sample of twins in Adelaide while completing his honours thesis.

Academic career
Martin moved to the United Kingdom to complete a PhD in 1977 under Lindon Eaves at the University of Birmingham. After working as a research fellow at the Department of Genetics of the University of Birmingham (1976–1978) and at the Department of Population Biology, Research School of Biological Sciences, Australian National University (1978–1983), he took a post as an Assistant Professor in the Department of Human Genetics at the Medical College of Virginia (1983–1986). He returned to Australia in 1986, moving to Brisbane, where he currently directs the Genetic Epidemiology Laboratory at the QIMR Berghofer Medical Research Institute (QIMR Berghofer). Since 1992, he has been an adjunct Professor in the Departments of Pathology (1993), Zoology (1996), and Psychology (2003) at the University of Queensland, and Senior Principal Research Fellow at the QIMR Berghofer Medical Research Institute.

Together with J.D. Mathews, he established in 1978 the Australian Twin Registry. QIMR Berghofer is now home to one of the largest twin studies in the world.

Honours
Martin has twice won the Fulker Award for best paper in Behavior Genetics (1999 & 2003), the Dobzhansky Award for Outstanding Contributions to Behavior Genetics (2005), and the James Shields Award of the International Society of Twin Studies for outstanding contributions to twin research (1986), and is a Fellow of the Australian Academy of the Social Sciences. In addition, he has been president of the Behavior Genetics Association (1996–1997), and is editor-in-chief of Twin Research and Human Genetics. He is on the editorial boards of several academic journals and is on the Advisory Board of the Australian NHMRC Twin Registry. He was elected Fellow of the Australian Academy of Health and Medical Sciences (FAHMS) in 2015.

References

External links
 N. G. Martin CV
 List of publications

1950 births
Living people
People educated at Prince Alfred College
University of Adelaide alumni
Academics from Brisbane
Behavior geneticists
Alumni of the University of Birmingham
Academics of the University of Birmingham
Academic journal editors
Fellows of the Australian Academy of Health and Medical Sciences